The University of New England Students' Association  (UNESA) was the representative body for students at the University of New England, Australia. It has existed in myriad forms over many decades. The vision statement of its most recent incorporation expressed a vision to: “Represent without fear or favour the students of the University of New England. To encourage participation in a fair and just tertiary experience through shared higher thinking.”

The latest iteration of student governance is the UNELife Student Advisory Committe. UNE remains the only Australian University that does not allow a true student government.

Historical Operations 

Under UNESA, TUNE! FM was initially established in April 1970. Then known as Radio UNE, it was the first student radio station in Australia. Further established under UNESA was the student newspaper, Nucleus (established April 1947). It also entirely funded a Dentist paid for by the 'dental levy' - the first dental service at a University in Australia. Also funded were a second hand bookshop and many affiliated clubs and societies. These services (except dentistry) still exist at the university, whether under UNESA or other bodies. Following UNESA's dissolution in 2006, these services were largely delivered by ServicesUNE Ltd.

In 2015, management of Clubs and Societies, Tune!FM, Uni4me (Independent Student Advocates), and the 2nd Hand Bookstore were transferred from UNESA to UNE Life by order of the University of New England's CFO Prof. Peter Creamer. UNESA was until 2018 involved with the following operations:
 The Legacy Scholarship Fund
 Nucleus - student news paper 
 Professional Experience Name Badges
 Advocacy to federal student bodies
 Advocacy to federal and state parliaments

Divisions and Reformations 

Prior to 1990, the association was known as the UNE Students' Representative Council and, for a time, as the Armidale Students' Association. Following the introduction of voluntary student unionism, UNESA was dissolved at a special general meeting of the members in late March 2006. The functions and services previously provided by UNESA were taken over by Services UNE Ltd  and split into two different organisations (for undergraduates and post-graduates respectively): Undergrads@UNE and Postgrads@UNE. Undergrads@UNE was replaced in 2009 by 'UNEG Ltd' (UNE Guild). Postgrads@UNE remained separate under the same name until 2013, when both groups reunited with the re-establishment of the University of New England Students Association. In 2018, UNESA was disbanded again following an adverse ruling by Fair Trading NSW.

In July 2018, Fair Trading NSW decided to shut down UNESA due to governance issues.

UNE Liberal Club 
In February 2005, University of New England Liberal Club (UNELC) (Liberal Party of Australia) members won control of the Students' Association. UNELC members also controlled the student union and the University Council undergraduate position.

UNESA split from the National Union of Students in a disaffiliation referendum. UNESA was among the few student organisations in Australia to support voluntary student unionism.

In September 2005 UNESA made world news following the appointment of a Heterosexual Officer. This position and the position of Men's Officer were created at the same time as the position of Homosexual Officer was disbanded along with the campus "queer space".

In March 2006, under the control of UNELC, UNESA was dissolved.

Past Presidents of UNESA
 1940-1942 Dr. J. Belshaw
 1942-1944 N.O'Grady
 1944-1945 T.Swanson
 1945-1946 F. Chong
 1946-1951 E. Tapp
 1951-1952 N. Fletcher/ C. Wickham
 1952-1953 W. Furniss
 1953-1954 E. Watson
 1954-1955 G. Harvey/  E. Boeham
 1955-1956 D. Lamberton
 1956-1957 M. Kelley
 1958-1974 - Records unclear
 1975 Laurie Hagan
 1976 Celia Smith
 1978 Karen Harris
 1979 Gavin Roberts
 1980 Stephanie Williams (Lawson)
 1981 Kirsty Arnold / David Cook
 1982-1983 Eva Cawthorne
 1984 Christopher Morley
 1985 Andrew Quirk
 1986-1987 Angela Jackson
 1987 Jack Tynan
 1987-1988 Peter Legg (interim)
 1988 Paschal Leahy
 1989 Paul Mc Dermott
 1990 Steven Blaney 
 1991 Steven Blaney
 1992 Steven Blaney
 1993 Lawrence James (Louis Armand)
 1994-1995 Adam Mara
 1996-1997 Tanya Gadiel (née Barber)
 1998 Siobhan Barry
 1999 James Stevens
 2000-2001 - Tom Fisher
 2001-2002 - Kahn Quinlan
 2003 - Kryssy Loker
 2004 - Phil Schubert
 2005 - Samantha Aber
 2006 - Tim Fisher 
 2006 - Amos Young
 2006-2007 - Les Wells (Interim)
 2007 - Andrew Zhen  
 2007-2008 - Benjamin Graham
 2009-2010 - Emily Hill
 2010-2012 - Sonia-Lee Donohue
 2013-2015 - David Mailler
 2015-2016 - Judd Newton
 2016-2017 - Dale Finch
 2017-2018 - Koady Williams

References

External links
 - UNESA Official Website
UNE News and Events Agreement assures student services at UNE, February 2006
The Deadly Newt - underground campus site

Students' unions in Australia
University of New England (Australia)